This is a list of the number ones of the UK Compilation Chart.

List of UK Compilation Chart number-one albums of the 1980s
List of UK Compilation Chart number-one albums of the 1990s
List of UK Compilation Chart number-one albums of the 2000s
List of UK Compilation Chart number-one albums of the 2010s
List of UK Compilation Chart number-one albums of the 2020s

See also
List of Classical Compilation Albums Chart number ones

External links
Compilation Albums Top 40 at the Official Chart Company
The Official UK Compilation Chart at MTV
UK Top 40 Compilation Albums at BBC Radio 1